Caseyville is a village in St. Clair County, Illinois, United States. The population was 4,245 at the 2010 census, a decline from 4,310 in 2000.

History
A wealthy man named Charles Harbour built a house here, and in 1845 built a sawmill. There were deposits of coal in the area, and Harbour was one of several members of the Illinois Coal Company, along with Zadok Casey, Walter Seates, Malcomb Robinson, Charles Barrett and John Roy. Casey had held several offices including United States Representative and Lieutenant Governor of Illinois. In 1849, the Illinois Coal Company founded the town and named it for Casey. Coal mining began, and in 1851 the company constructed a railroad to nearby Brooklyn to transport the coal.  In 1850 there were about 40 people here, and by 1851 this had increased to about 150; by 1881 the population was approximately 800. The first post office was established here in 1856, and the village was incorporated in May 1869. A school was built in 1872, and a church in 1879.

Geography
Caseyville is located at  (38.633176, -90.032785).

Demographics

As of the census of 2000, there were 4,310 people, 1,686 households, and 1,126 families residing in the village. The racial makeup of the village was 89.30% White, 7.84% African American, 0.35% Native American, 0.16% Asian, 1.04% from other races, and 1.30% from two or more races. Hispanic or Latino of any race were 3.53% of the population.

There were 1,686 households, out of which 28.2% had children under the age of 18 living with them, 46.4% were married couples living together, 14.5% had a female householder with no husband present, and 33.2% were non-families. 25.8% of all households were made up of individuals, and 12.6% had someone living alone who was 65 years of age or older. The average household size was 2.48 and the average family size was 2.98.

In the village, the population was spread out, with 23.3% under the age of 18, 8.7% from 18 to 24, 27.9% from 25 to 44, 22.2% from 45 to 64, and 17.9% who were 65 years of age or older. The median age was 39 years. For every 100 females, there were 93.4 males. For every 100 females age 18 and over, there were 89.5 males.

The median income for a household in the village was $31,512, and the median income for a family was $36,429. Males had a median income of $30,943 versus $20,713 for females. The per capita income for the village was $15,467. About 6.8% of families and 9.8% of the population were below the poverty line, including 15.4% of those under age 18 and 5.6% of those age 65 or over.

Notable people 

 Larry Doyle, second baseman for the New York Giants, Chicago Cubs, and New York Giants
 Yadier Molina, catcher for St. Louis Cardinals, resided here until 2015

References

External links 
 Village of Caseyville

Populated places in St. Clair County, Illinois
Villages in Illinois